Daman and Diu Lok Sabha constituency  is one of the two Lok Sabha constituencies in the union territory of Dadra and Nagar Haveli and Daman and Diu in western India. This constituency came into existence in 1987, following the implementation of the Goa, Daman, and Diu Reorganisation Act, 1987 (Act No. 18 of 1987).

Members of Parliament

Election results

1987 by-election
 The constituency did not exist at the time of 1984 general election, but was specially created in 1987 when Goa became a state, and Daman and Diu ceased to be associated with Goa.
 Gopal Kalan Tandel (Indian National Congress) : 17,027 votes 
 Narayan Srinivasa Fugro (independent) : 9,303 votes

2004

2009

2014

2019

See also
 Daman and Diu
 1987 Daman and Diu by-election
 Dadra and Nagar Haveli (Lok Sabha constituency) 
 List of Constituencies of the Lok Sabha

References

Lok Sabha constituencies in Dadra and Nagar Haveli and Daman and Diu
1987 establishments in Daman and Diu
Constituencies established in 1987
Lok Sabha
Elections in Daman and Diu